Robert John Pyne (born 23 April 1967) is an Australian politician, currently serving as a Cairns Region councillor as a member of the Socialist Alliance. He was a member of the Legislative Assembly of Queensland from January 2015 until November 2017, representing the electorate of Cairns. Pyne was elected for the Australian Labor Party, but resigned to sit as an independent in March 2016; he then lost his seat to a Labor candidate at the 2017 election. Pyne was formerly a two-term councillor for the Cairns Regional Council. Pyne is the first quadriplegic member of any parliament of Australia.

Early life 

Pyne was born in Gordonvale, the son of former Cairns mayor Tom Pyne, and raised in the suburb of Edmonton. He had a spinal cord injury in December 1991 through breaking his neck diving into shallow water when he was 23 years old, which resulted in him becoming quadriplegic. He spent nine months recovering in the Princess Alexandra Hospital's Spinal Unit in Brisbane before going on to gain a Bachelor of Arts with Honours in History and Politics from James Cook University in 1999 and a Bachelor of Laws degree from Queensland University of Technology in 2002. In 1997, he served as President of the James Cook University Student Association.

Career 

Before his accident, Rob worked for the Public Trustee of Queensland. After attaining his degrees he worked as Regional Disability Liaison Officer at James Cook University Cairns before becoming a politician.
He first ran in 2008 as Division 3 councillor in the Cairns Regional Council elections, beating the former Deputy Mayor Terry James
He inspected the Cairns Regional Council head office prior to taking up his role to ensure it was wheelchair accessible.
He was re-elected in 2012.
Division 3 includes the suburbs of Bayview Heights, Lamb Range, Mount Sheridan, White Rock and Woree.
In March 2014 a Local Government formal complaint was filed against him for breaching Cairns Regional Council's media policy rules.

In September 2013, he announced that he would contest Australian Labor Party preselection for the 2015 state election in the seat of Cairns, and in April 2014 he was nominated as the Labor candidate. He won the election in January 2015, defeating sitting Liberal National Party MP Gavin King.

In March 2015, Queensland's Parliament building underwent renovations to accommodate its first quadriplegic member of parliament, including removing two seats and desks in the chamber to allow Pyne wheelchair access.

In January 2016, Pyne resigned from the Labor Party's left faction. On 7 March 2016, after being publicly critical of a number of government decisions, Pyne resigned from the Labor Party, saying that he was "no longer prepared to be told how to vote by someone from Brisbane". He moved to the crossbench to sit as an independent member.  However, he stated he would continue to back Labor on confidence and supply matters.

On 5 May 2016, Pyne submitted a private members bill to the Queensland Parliament to decriminalise abortion in Queensland. In February 2017, he withdrew the bill after it became apparent it would not get sufficient support in its present form in Parliament. The issue of abortion was referred to the Queensland Law Reform Commission to consider a new framework for legislation in relation to the termination of pregnancy. On 19 June 2017, the Queensland Attorney-General Yvettte D'Ath officially issued the Queensland Law Reform Commission with the terms of reference for a review and investigation into modernising Queensland's laws in relation to the termination of pregnancy.

In 2020, Pyne joined the Socialist Alliance party.

Personal life 

His father Tom Pyne was an Australian politician from 1961 until 2000. He was first elected to Mulgrave Shire Council in 1961 and served as deputy-chairman of Mulgrave Shire in 1976, chairman in 1979, 1982, 1983, 1988 and 1991 and elected Mayor of Cairns City Council in 1995. He died in October 2011.

Rob Pyne lives in the Cairns suburb of Mount Sheridan. His wife Jenny died suddenly following a fall on 30th July 2022. He has a daughter Katie.

References

External links 

Interview Channel 7 news

1967 births
Living people
People with paraplegia
Members of the Queensland Legislative Assembly
Australian politicians with disabilities
Australian Labor Party members of the Parliament of Queensland
Independent members of the Parliament of Queensland
Queensland local councillors
21st-century Australian politicians